Tehillat Hashem ("praise of God" in Hebrew) is the name of a prayer-book (known as a siddur in Hebrew) used for Jewish services in synagogues and privately by Hasidic Jews, specifically in the Chabad-Lubavitch community. The name of the siddur is taken from Psalm 145, verse 21, "Praise of God shall my mouth speak, and all flesh shall bless His holy Name forever and ever." The siddur is a photocopy of the Siddur "Seder HaAvodah", published by Vilna 1901 , with corrections and additions from the Lubavitcher Rebbe Rabbi Menachem Mendel Schneerson.

Tehillat Hashem Siddur is an edition of the Siddur Harav or Siddur Admur Hazaken, edited and published by Rabbi Shneur Zalman of Liadi (1745–1812) the founder of the Chabad-Lubavitch movement, and follows the teachings of Rabbi Isaac Luria. 
The Siddur Ha'avoda Siddur, printed in Vilna in 1851, is the basis for this Siddur, and includes corrections and additions made by the Lubavitcher Rebbe in the first years of his arrival in the United States, when he headed the Kehot publishing house from the day it was established. (except for the edition that was printed in Rostov) Because the basis of the Siddur is taken from the Seder HaAvodah, most of the names of hashem in it are formed of two letter Yud's. However, wherever the wording was completely different, copy the wording of the Siddur 'Torah Or', where the names are the tetragrammaton name in its entirety.
Later in 1945 an enlarged, completed edition of this siddur was published by the Merkos L'Inyonei Chinuch in Brooklyn, New York for the use of Jewish school students.
The siddur also features extracts from the Shulchan Aruch HaRav relevant to certain rituals.
Some editions of the Rostov siddur, published in Rostov-on-Don, Russia in 1918–1920 entitled Siddur Tehillas Hashem.

Another edition of Siddur Admur Hazaken is called Siddur Torah Ohr

Glosses and corrections in future editions 

Although the Lubavitcher Rebbe himself took great pains to prepare the Siddur , he wrote about a particular halakhah written in the Siddur that is incorrect , concluding : "The complete Siddur Tehilas Hashem is a photograph of a preceding siddur and there wasn't enough time to edit it as needed." For this reason many errors in the early editions have been corrected in the many new editions.

After the first edition, when R. David Brawman printed the Siddur in 1947 in Munich , the Rebbe sent him glosses on the Siddur, but they did not materialize.
Other glosses, 47 in number (they may be identical to the previous ones) were made in preparation for the 1966 edition , so the arrangement was printed in both regular and pocket format.

English Translations

Tehillat Hashem Siddur was first translated to English by Rabbi Nissen Mangel and published in 1978, Later another translation was made by Rabbi Eliyahu Touger, and a Youth Translation was made by an editorial team and published in 2012–2014.

See also
Nusach Ari

References

Chabad-Lubavitch texts
Jews and Judaism in Rostov-on-Don
Siddur versions